Ignacio Pizarro (born 8 February 1990) is an Argentine handball player for UNLu and the Argentine national team.

He represented Argentina at the 2019 World Men's Handball Championship.

Individual awards
2020 South and Central American Men's Handball Championship: Best left wing and top scorer
2022 South and Central American Men's Handball Championship: Best left wing

References

1990 births
Living people
Argentine male handball players
Handball players at the 2019 Pan American Games
Pan American Games medalists in handball
Pan American Games gold medalists for Argentina
Medalists at the 2019 Pan American Games
Handball players at the 2020 Summer Olympics
21st-century Argentine people